Cantwells Run is a stream in Coshocton County, in the U.S. state of Ohio.

Cantwells Run was named for Thomas Cantwell, a pioneer who settled there about 1806.

See also
List of rivers of Ohio

References

Rivers of Coshocton County, Ohio
Rivers of Ohio